Clemente Aguirre (November 23, 1828 – October 24, 1900) was a Mexican composer and music instructor in Guadalajara, Jalisco, during the 19th century.  His father died when he was a child, leaving his family in poverty.  Nonetheless, when he was 11, he was accepted to study music with Professor Jesús González Rubio, composer of the well-known Jarabe tapatío ("Mexican Hat Dance").

See also
 Statue of Clemente Aguirre

References
Clemente Aguirre, Precursor de La Banda de alientos en nuestro país: Gabriel Pareyón
Program Notes (in Spanish)

1828 births
1900 deaths
Mexican composers
Mexican male composers
Mexican people of Basque descent
19th-century composers
19th-century male musicians
19th-century musicians